Volm may refer to:

Saralisa Volm (born 1985), German actress
Volm, a fictional race in the Falling Skies television series